The Albanians Decisively (Албанци одлучнo) was a socially conservative Albanian minority politics political alliance in Montenegro.

History
The alliance was formed by three major Albanian parties in Montenegro, the Albanian Alternative (AA), the New Democratic Power - FORCA and the  Democratic Union of Albanians (DUA),  prior to the 2016 elections. Genci Nimanbegu (FORCA) headed the joint electoral list at the parliamentary election in October 2016.

Coalition members
 New Democratic Force (Forca) of Nazif Cungu, Mayor of Ulcinj
 Albanian Alternative (AA) of Nik Gjeloshaj, Mayor of Tuzi
 Democratic Union of Albanians (DUA) of Mehmet Zenka, Minister of Human and Minority Rights in the Government of Montenegro

References

Defunct political party alliances in Montenegro
Albanian political parties in Montenegro
Political parties established in 2016
Pro-European political parties in Montenegro